Devil in the Details is the fourth album by Saigon Kick, and the first to feature guitarist Pete Dembrowski.

The artwork used for the cover of the album is titled 'Winners And Losers' by painter Charles Bragg.

Critical reception
Larry Flick of Billboard called the promo single for the song "Eden" in his positive review an "eclectic offering" and wrote, "Determined vocals join wandering piano keystrokes and a flurry of blazing guitars to form a surprisingly melodic rock track."

Track listing

Personnel

Saigon Kick
 Chris McLernon – bass, chant (2)
 Pete Dembrowski – guitar, chant (2)
 Phil Varone – drums, percussion, chant (2)
 Jason Bieler – vocals, guitar, programming, production, chant (2)

Additional musicians
 Howard Helm – programming (15)

Technical personnel
 Ronny Lahti – production, engineering, mixing, additional background vocals
 Jim Morris – assistant engineering, additional background vocals (1), chant (2)
 Tom Morris – additional background vocals (1), mastering, chant (2)
 Silvio – chant (2)
 Aaron Bieler – chant (2)
 Adrian von Ripka – remastering
 Tim Gavin – artwork, design
 Mark Weiss – photography back of booklet

References

Saigon Kick albums
1995 albums
CMC International albums